Raymond Madison Brown (born January 12, 1949 in Fort Worth, Texas) is a former American football safety in the National Football League. He was drafted by the Atlanta Falcons in the sixth round of the 1971 NFL Draft. In 1973 he led the Falcons with six interceptions. He played college football at West Texas State which is now known as West Texas A&M University.

Brown also played for the New Orleans Saints.

References

1949 births
Living people
Players of American football from Fort Worth, Texas
American football cornerbacks
American football safeties
West Texas A&M Buffaloes football players
Atlanta Falcons players
New Orleans Saints players